Shukur Burkhanov (15 September 1910 – 15 August 1987) was a Soviet and Uzbek stage and film actor. He is recognized as People's artist of UzSSR

Burkhanov was born and grew up in Tashkent (then part of the Russian Empire) in a strict Muslim family. In order to join the Uzbek drama theatre, which was founded in the 1920s, he had to leave home because his family's orthodox religious beliefs forbade acting.

At the time Uzbek theatre was still in its infancy. In 1930 he received training at the Moscow Art Theatre, which he credited as enabling him to play classic roles such as Romeo, Hamlet, and Oedipus.

Burkhanov was involved in Uzbek cinema from its very inception. The Uzbekfilm studio typecast him as a rebel who challenged the old order and traditions.

In the early 1970s he was the subject of a documentary, People's Artist Shukur Burkhanov, narrated by fellow actor Boris Andreyev.

Awards 
 Order of the Red Banner of Labour (1945)
Order of the Badge of Honour (1951)
People's Artist of the USSR (1959)
 Two Orders of Lenin (1959, 1970)
Order of the October Revolution (1980)
Order of Outstanding Merit (2001, posthumous)

References

External links 

 

1910 births
1987 deaths
20th-century Uzbekistani male actors
People from Syr-Darya Oblast
Actors from Tashkent
Communist Party of the Soviet Union members
People's Artists of the USSR
Recipients of the Order of Lenin
Recipients of the Order of the Red Banner of Labour
Male Shakespearean actors
Soviet male film actors
Soviet male stage actors
Uzbekistani male film actors
Uzbekistani male stage actors